Castalia , in Greek mythology, was a naiad-nymph of Phocis, a daughter of the river-god Achelous who inhabited the Castalian spring in Delphi. Mythology connects her to Apollo, the god of Delphi.

Mythology 
In older traditions, Castalian spring already existed by the time Apollo came to Delphi searching for Python. According to some, the water was a gift to Castalia from the river Cephisus. 

In his commentary on Statius's Thebaid, Latin poet Lactantius Placidus says that to escape Apollo's amorous advances, Castalia transformed herself into a fountain at Delphi, at the base of Mount Parnassus, or at Mount Helicon. She inspired the genius of poetry to those who drank her waters or listened to their quiet sound; the sacred water was also used to clean the Delphian temples. Apollo consecrated Castalia to the Muses (Castaliae Musae).

The 20th-century German writer Hermann Hesse used Castalia as inspiration for the name of the futuristic fictional utopia in his 1943 magnum opus The Glass Bead Game. Castalia is home to an austere order of intellectuals with a twofold mission: to run boarding schools for boys, and to nurture and play the Glass Bead Game.

See also 
 Castalian Spring
 Castalia House
 4769 Castalia, an Earth-crossing asteroid
 646 Kastalia, an asteroid

References

External links 
 
 CASTALIA from The Theoi Project

Naiads
Children of Achelous
Women of Apollo
Metamorphoses into bodies of water in Greek mythology
Nymphs